Bhagirathi Parbat IV (Hindi: भागीरथी पर्वत IV) is a mountain in Uttarakhand, India. It is the fourth highest peak in the Bhagirathi Massif. It is located between Gangotri Glacier and Vasuki Glacier.

Climbing history
In 2009 three Slovenians, Rok Blagus, Luka Lindic, and Marko Prezelj, climbed and descended the west face of Bhagirathi IV in a single day, the first reported ascent of this peak.

Neighboring and subsidiary peaks
 Bhagirathi Parbat I, 6,856 m (22493 ft), 
 Bhagirathi Parbat II, 6,512 m (21365 ft), 
 Bhagirathi Parbat III, 6,454 m (21175 ft), 
 Satopanth, 7,075 m (23,212 ft), 
 Vasuki Parbat, 6,792 m (22,283 ft),

Glaciers and rivers
The Gangotri Glacier is on the west side, Vasuki Glacier is on the east side, and Chaturangi Glacier is on the north side. From the snout of Gangotri Glacier emerges Bhagirathi river, also called Ganga or Ganges.

See also
 List of Himalayan peaks of Uttarakhand

References

Mountains of Uttarakhand
Six-thousanders of the Himalayas
Geography of Chamoli district